The genus Spizella is a group of American sparrows in the family Passerellidae.

These birds are fairly small and slim, with short bills, round heads and long wings. They are usually found in semi-open areas, and outside of the nesting season they often forage in small mixed flocks.

Systematics
This genus was formerly placed with the Old World buntings in the family Emberizidae. However, genetic studies revealed that New World sparrows formed a distinct clade and thus it was placed in the resurrected family Passerellidae.

Species
 Chipping sparrow, Spizella passerina
 Clay-colored sparrow, Spizella pallida
 Brewer's sparrow, Spizella breweri
 Timberline sparrow, Spizella breweri taverneri
 Field sparrow, Spizella pusilla
 Worthen's sparrow, Spizella wortheni
 Black-chinned sparrow, Spizella atrogularis

The American tree sparrow, Spizelloides arborea, was formerly a member of this group, but is now placed in its own monotypic genus Spizelloides.

References

 
Bird genera
American sparrows
Taxa named by Charles Lucien Bonaparte